Amir-Banoo Karimi (Amiri Firouzkuhi/ Mosaffa; ; born 31 December 1931) is an Iranian academic and professor of Persian literature, specializing in classical Persian literature and the work of Saib Tabrizi. In 2004, Karimi was inducted into the Iranian Science and Culture Hall of Fame for her lifelong contributions to Persian studies, language, and literature.

Life and career
Amir Banoo Karimi is the eldest child of Iranian poet, Seyed Karim Amiri Firuzkuhi.

Born in Tehran during the reign of Reza Shah, Amir Banoo was unable to acquire her father's last name, namely, Amiri Firuzkuhi due to its political connotations, "Amir" meaning king or emir hence, Emir of Firuzkuh. Consequently, she was forced to adopt her father's first name, Karim as her last name.

Karimi pursued her education in the field of Persian Literature at the University of Tehran where she also taught as a professor upon graduation. She later married Mozaher Mosaffa, a Persian poet and professor of Persian literature at the University of Tehran.

Selected works

Books
Works include but are not limited to:
 Edited edition 1 through 4 of Jawami ul-Hikayat 
 Compilation and critique of the two editions of the Divan-i Amiri Firuzkuhi: Ghazaliyat va Qasa'id by Seyed Karim Amiri Firuzkuhi
 (1989) The Ghazals of Saib Tabrizi
 (1993) Edited edition of the Divan of Hakim Abdolrazagh Lahiji, publication of the University of Tehran Press. 
 (1995) Critical Analysis of Hakim Sanai's The Walled Garden of Truth

Articles
Prominent literary essays include:
 The Missing Sources of Jawami ul-Hikayat
 The Double-Sided Coin: Mansur Al-Hallaj
 The Representation of Women in Persian Poetry
 Saba's Illness

See also
Seyed Karim Amiri Firuzkuhi
Ali Mosaffa
Jafar Shahidi

References

Living people
University of Tehran alumni
Academic staff of the University of Tehran
1931 births
People related to Persian literature
Iranian Science and Culture Hall of Fame recipients in Literature and Culture
Faculty of Letters and Humanities of the University of Tehran alumni